Yemi is a unisex Nigerian and Yoruba given name. It means "to befit me" and is short for many names such as Olayemi meaning Wealth befits me, Oluyemi meaning God befits me, Adeyemi meaning Royalty befits me, and others. Notable people with the name include:

Yemi Abiodun (born 1980), English footballer
Yemi Adamolekun, Nigerian activist
Yemi Adesanya (born 1978), Nigerian accountant
Yemi Ajibade (1929–2013, Nigerian playwright and actor
Yemi Akinyemi Dele (born 1981), Czech choreographer
Yemi Alade (born 1989), Nigerian singer-songwriter
Yemi Akinseye George (born 1963), Nigerian law professor
Yémi Apithy (born 1989), French-Beninese sabre fencer
Yemi Fawole (born 1985), Nigerian chess player
Yemi Idowu (born 1968), Nigerian businessman
Yemi Kale, Nigerian statistician
Yemi Odubade (born 1984), Nigerian footballer
Yemi Osinbajo (born 1957), Nigerian lawyer and politician
Yemi Shodimu (born 1960), Nigerian filmmaker
Yemi Tella (c. 1951–2007), Nigerian football coach
Yemi Elebuibon (born 1947)

Unisex given names
Yoruba given names